Zdeňka Bartoňová-Šilhavá (born 15 June 1954 in Krnov, Czechoslovakia) is a retired female track and field athlete from the Czech Republic, who set the world record in the women's discus throw on 26 August 1984 with a distance of . That mark still is the national record.

Šilhavá represented Czechoslovakia at the 1988 Summer Olympics in Seoul, South Korea, finishing in sixth place in the women's discus, and in eleventh place in the women's shot put event. She threw again in the 1996 Summer Olympics at the age of 42.  Three years after the Olympics, she threw masters W45 world records in both the shot put and discus that still stand.

Doping 
Šilhavá tested positive for anabolic steroids at the European Cup in Moscow in August 1985 and was subsequently banned for life by the European Athletics Federation. The ban was later reduced to 18 months by the IAAF.

Personal life
She is married to discus thrower Josef Šilhavý.

Achievements

References

1954 births
Living people
Athletes (track and field) at the 1980 Summer Olympics
Athletes (track and field) at the 1988 Summer Olympics
Athletes (track and field) at the 1996 Summer Olympics
Doping cases in athletics
Czech sportspeople in doping cases
Czech female discus throwers
Czech female shot putters
People from Krnov
Olympic athletes of Czechoslovakia
Olympic athletes of the Czech Republic
Place of birth missing (living people)
Czech masters athletes
Friendship Games medalists in athletics
Sportspeople from the Moravian-Silesian Region